is a 2019 Japanese fantasy film adaptation of a video game series of the same name, The cast from Stage: Touken Ranbu will be reprising their roles. Distributed by Toho and Universal Pictures, the film was directed by Saiji Yakumo and written by Yasuko Kobayashi, and was released in Japan on January 18, 2019. The theme song of the film, "UNBROKEN" by Takanori Nishikawa feat. Tomoyasu Hotei.

Plot
It is the year 2205. The Saniwa, a sage who has the power to animate legendary swords and bring them to life, informs one of his Touken Danshi (swordsmen) Mikazuki Munechika of the Time Retrograde's Army (TRA) plan to change history by preventing Oda Nobunaga's death at the Honnoji Incident. The Saniwa sends a team consisting of six swords left in their citadel home: captain Mikazuki Munechika, Yamanbagiri Kunihiro, Yagen Toushirou, Heshikiri Hasebe, Fudou Yukimitsu, and Nihongou to travel back in time to the Honnoji Incident.

At Honno-ji temple, Nobunaga and his vassal, Mori Ranmaru, attempt to hold down the fort while the traitorous Akechi Mitsuhide and his men attack. Seeing no way out, Nobunaga retreats to his room and commands Mori to hold down the fort. The TRA show up at the scene and attack Akechi’s soldiers, but Hasebe, Fudou, and Nihongou arrive to assist while Yagen and Yamanbagiri tackle a strange individual TRA member. Mikazuki reaches Nobunaga's quarter's in time to stave off the TRA and gives Nobunaga his space to commit seppuku.

Uguisumaru welcomes them back to the citadel and introduces a newly arrived Touken Danshi: Honebami Toushirou, older brother to Yagen and former companion of Mikazuki. It is revealed that Honebami cannot recall his past due to amnesia. Mikazuki dissuades the others from visiting the Saniwa, raising suspicions. Meanwhile, news of Nobunaga’s death travels to his general Toyotomi Hideyoshi, who grieves in a mad rage.

While Mikazuki reports the success to the Saniwa and discusses recent events, the Touken Danshi become suspicious as to why they have rarely seen their master besides Mikazuki. 

Back in 1582, Nobunaga Oda awakes in a cavern and is faced with the strange TRA member who Yagen had previously battled. The stranger introduces himself as Mumei (No Name) and pledges the loyalty of the TRA to Oda Nobunaga, who is more than pleased to have cheated death. Mikazuki is urgently summoned to the Saniwa's room with the same news. Upon hearing the Saniwa’s self-reproach, Mikazuki insists he will set things right. The team is reassembled, with Fudou being replaced by Honebami.

Mikazuki is confronted by a suspicious Uguisumaru, who asks about the Saniwa and is told he would be needed soon. Nihongou eavesdrops on them. At the portal, Honebami expresses his conflict over what it means to protect history. Mikazuki announces the team's new mission: to assassinate the still-alive Oda Nobunaga.

Toyotomi Hideyoshi returns to avenge his lord by chasing Mitsuhide to Shōryūji Castle. Nobunaga, his new TRA army, and Mumei send a messenger to Hideyoshi of his survival and plans. The Touken Danshi split up to trail Nobunaga, Akechi and to stop Nobunaga's message from reaching Hideyoshi. Yamanbagiri, Hasebe, and Nihongou voiced their concerns about Mikazuki's secrecy before departing. Mikazuki addresses Honebami’s concerns and asks him for a favor.

Yagen and Yamanbagiri trail Mitsuhide and bump into Mikazuki and Honebami who were trailing Nobunaga. Nobunaga attacks Akechi directly, but in a sudden change of heart, Mumei jumps between the two men in defense of Mitsuhide. Mikazuki intervened in the battle using the moment of shock and directed Nobunaga away, fleeing into the night. The other Touken Danshi attempt to follow, but a TRA ootachi brute forces them to retreat before re-assuming control over Mumei. Akechi Mitsuhide vanishes from history.

Hasebe and Nihongou trail the messenger to Hideyoshi and cut him down, but Hideyoshi had received Nobunaga's letter. Despite being persuaded that the letter was fake, Hideyoshi reveals to the two that he is going to occupy Nobunaga’s castle, Azuchi Castle, and insists the Touken Danshi follow him. Yamanbagiri and Nihongou trade messages via carrier pigeon, stating Mikazuki’s apparent betrayal, and the rest agree to meet up at Azuchi Castle.

Mikazuki tells Nobunaga that he only wishes to escort him to Azuchi Castle safely. Nobunaga does not trust Mikazuki but he accepts Mikazuki’s aid.

While Yamanbagiri, Yagen, and Honebami rest and recuperate, Yamanbagiri and Yagen are confused at Mikazuki’s betrayal to run off with Nobunaga. As Honebami assists them, they decide that they would stop Mikazuki if he turns traitor.

On route to Azuchi, Hideyoshi reveals to Hasebe and Nihongou that he knew all along that the two were lying: Nobunaga was indeed alive and Hideyoshi intends to kill Nobunaga himself. Hideyoshi attempts to assassinate the two, but both escape.

Mikazuki and Nobunaga arrive at Azuchi Castle with Nobunaga waiting expectantly for Hideyoshi to arrive with support. Nobunaga goads Mikazuki, insisting that his history now is the correct history. The TRA split up their forces, with Mumei protecting Nobunaga while the ootachi leaves to complete their own mission: an attack on the Saniwa’s citadel. Fudou notices the attack on the citadel's shields. He rushes to find the Saniwa but finds his master shrouded in a bright glow. Uguisumaru quietly steers Fudou away.

Hideyoshi arrives at Azuchi Castle. However, Hideyoshi starts attacking its walls while ordering his men to ‘flush Mitsuhide’s men out’. Angered at Hideyoshi's betrayal, Nobunaga draws his sword on Mikazuki, who only calmly replies that history can be rewritten but Nobunaga is still doomed. The rest of the Touken Danshi arrive to find Azuchi Castle under attack. Yagen, Nobunaga’s dagger, finally recalls the newly-corrected history: Nobunaga escaped Honnoji with Mori’s help but dies at Azuchi Castle after being betrayed by Toyotomi Hideyoshi. Mikazuki’s buried historical secret is revealed as Hideyoshi brandishes the sword of Mikazuki Munechika, a war spoil that Nobunaga gifted to Hideyoshi.

Mumei and the TRA move in to attack Hideyoshi’s men. Honebami speeds off, leaving the others behind to face the rest of the enemies. Mikazuki leaves Nobunaga and reunites with Honebami, who passes him a bag of items. Nobunaga ambushes them and holds Honebami hostage, demanding Mikazuki to escort him to safety. Mikazuki refuses and answers both Nobunaga's and Honebami's concerns: Mikazuki believes that protecting history as he knows it will protect the many things he cherishes. He will protect Nobunaga as the legendary fearsome general he knows, but not the man that was now begging before him. Ultimately bested, Nobunaga releases Honebami and accepts his fate.

Back in the citadel, the shields break from the continuous assault. The ootachi brute materializes with his army on the citadel grounds, with only Uguisumaru and Fudou standing in their way.

When Mikazuki rejoins his companions, he reveals that Honebami had taken their teleportation spheres and passed them to him and sends them all back to the citadel against their wishes, stating that the Saniwa was in urgent need of their help. He confronts the enemy alone.

Upon their return, Uguisumaru is shocked that Mikazuki was not with them. The truth is revealed: The Saniwa was transferring out due to advanced age and loss of power. This put their citadel at its weakest state and the TRA chose to attack their home at this critical moment.

At Azuchi Castle, Mikazuki fights a losing battle. He gives out and falls - only to be caught by Hasebe and the returning Touken Danshi. They received new orders from their master: to retrieve Mikazuki. Rejuvenated and reunited, they take on Mumei and the TRA and successfully eradicate them. Nobunaga uses his blade, Yagen Toushirou, and commits seppuku successfully. As the Touken Danshi return to the citadel, a swirl of sakura petals surround Mumei and he vanishes as well.

The team returns to assist Uguisumaru and Fudou while Mikazuki stops the ootachi brute from directly attacking the Saniwa. Mikazuki bids farewell to the Saniwa who vanishes in the light. Mikazuki throws the ootachi out for the final confrontation, only for Mumei to sink his blade into his former comrade. Mumei finally overcomes his possession and reveals himself to be a Touken Danshi: Kurikara Gou, Akechi Mitsuhide’s short blade that was used against Nobunaga. Altogether, the Touken Danshi finish off the ootachi brute and end the TRA’s invasion.

After some time, the entire retinue of Touken Danshi awaits Mikazuki in the Saniwa’s hall. He reveals to them their new Saniwa, a little girl. Mikazuki mused to his old master that he now had more to cherish and protect, while the other Touken Danshi entertain their new master in peaceful times.

Cast
 Hiroki Suzuki as Mikazuki Munechika
 Yoshihiko Aramaki as Yamanbagiri Kunihiro
 Ryō Kitamura as Yagen Toushirou
 Masanari Wada as Heshikiri Hasebe 
 Taizo Shiina as Fudou Yukimitsu
 Hiroaki Iwanaga as Nihongou
 Fuma Sadamoto as Honebami Toushirou
 Tomoki Hirose as Uguisumaru
 Norito Yashima as Hashiba Hideyoshi
 Koji Yamamoto as Oda Nobunaga

References

External links
 
  

2010s Japanese films
2010s action adventure films
2010s fantasy adventure films
2010s Japanese superhero films
2010s science fiction films
Films set in Asia
Films set in Japan
Films shot in Japan
Japanese action films
Japanese adventure films
Japanese fantasy films
Japanese science fiction films
Live-action films based on video games
Toho films
Universal Pictures films